Chinna Rajulagumada is a village located in Vangara Mandal of Vizianagaram district in State of Andhra Pradesh. This village belongs to Palakonda revenue division.

References

External links 

Villages in Vangara mandal
Villages in Srikakulam district